Chahar Rah-e Tombal (also Romanized as Chahār Rāh-e Tombal; also known as Tak Tombal) is a village in Sadat Rural District, in the Central District of Lali County, Khuzestan Province, Iran. At the 2006 census, its population was 124, in 16 families.

References 

Populated places in Lali County